Kachi Mayu may refer to:

 Kachi Mayu (Chuquisaca)
 Kachi Mayu (Oruro)